Pier 35 is a pier along Lorimer Street on the Yarra River in Port Melbourne, Victoria, Australia. It contains the Pier 35 Bar and Grill restaurant, formerly the Steakhouse, and d'Albora Marinas, a major supplier of marina berths.  In 2004, Australia's leading marina owner, Macquarie Leisure, purchased Pier 35 for almost $A15 million.

References

External links
Restaurant website

Piers in Australia
Landmarks in Melbourne
Transport in Melbourne
Transport buildings and structures in Victoria (Australia)